Joseph Vander Wee (14 December 1902 – 11 October 1978) was a Belgian middle-distance runner. He competed in the men's 800 metres at the 1920 Summer Olympics.

References

External links
 

1902 births
1978 deaths
Athletes (track and field) at the 1920 Summer Olympics
Athletes (track and field) at the 1924 Summer Olympics
Belgian male middle-distance runners
Olympic athletes of Belgium